Timothee Heijbrock (born 28 October 1985) is a Dutch rower. He competed in the Men's lightweight coxless four event at the 2012 Summer Olympics.

References

External links
 

1985 births
Living people
Dutch male rowers
Olympic rowers of the Netherlands
Rowers at the 2012 Summer Olympics
Rowers at the 2016 Summer Olympics
People from Naarden
Sportspeople from North Holland